The Lagoni di Mercurago Nature Park, established in 1980, is a natural reserve in Piedmont, located in Mercurago, a hamlet near Arona, consisting of many lakes with swamp vegetation.

Landscape
Near Arona, on the morainic hills around Lake Maggiore, there is the Lagoni di Mercurago Nature Park which includes mires, pasture for horses and forests.

Archaeology
Prehistorical remains of the Terramare culture dating back to the Bronze Age and some Roman domus were found in the area. The first stilt house in Italy, a wooden pirogue and three weels, was found here in 1860.

Gallery

See also 
 CoEur - In the heart of European paths

References

External links

Official website
News about the park

Parks in Piedmont
Tourist attractions in Piedmont
Lagoni di Mercurago
Arona, Piedmont